The 1934 Tufts Jumbos football team represented Tufts University in the 1934 college football season. Led by Lewis Manly in his fifth year as head coach, Tufts finished the season with a perfect record of 8–0.

Schedule

References

Tufts
Tufts Jumbos football seasons
College football undefeated seasons
Tufts Jumbos football